The Rangitikei by-election of 1978 was a by-election in the New Zealand electorate of Rangitikei, a predominantly rural district in the middle of New Zealand's North Island. The by-election occurred on 18 February 1978, and was precipitated by the death of sitting National Party member of parliament (and Speaker of the House) Sir Roy Jack in December 1977.

Background
The by-election was contested by all major parties. It was won by Bruce Beetham, the Social Credit Party candidate, with a majority of 1,335. He became the second Social Credit Party MP in New Zealand's history. This upset was extremely rare in the post-war political climate of New Zealand, especially in a rural electorate that traditionally voted National (although such voting is more likely in a by-election). The National Party candidate Jim Bull came second, the Labour Party candidate (and rugby coach) JJ Stewart came third and the Values Party candidate Denis Hocking came fourth. JJ Stewart was a former teacher of Beetham's at New Plymouth Boys' High School who once gave him a caning.

Beetham was the Social Credit leader and had polled a strong second in the seat in 1975. National was hampered as its candidate was only a stand in until the general election later in the year. Sir Roy Jack had planned to retire then, to be replaced by the Minister of Education Les Gandar whose Ruahine seat had been abolished in boundary changes.

Results
The following table gives the election results:

See also
Rangitikei by-election (disambiguation), other by-elections for the Rangitikei electorate

Notes

References

External links 
Article by Fiona Rae from The New Zealand Listener of 7 May 2011

Rangitikei 1978
1978 elections in New Zealand
Politics of Rangitikei
1978 in New Zealand
February 1978 events in New Zealand